Yevgeniya Tsupenkova (born 24 July 1985) is a Kazakhstani handball player. She is member of the Kazakhstani national team. She competed at the 2015 World Women's Handball Championship in Denmark.

References

1985 births
Living people
Kazakhstani female handball players
Asian Games medalists in handball
Handball players at the 2006 Asian Games
Handball players at the 2010 Asian Games
Handball players at the 2014 Asian Games
Asian Games silver medalists for Kazakhstan
Asian Games bronze medalists for Kazakhstan
Medalists at the 2006 Asian Games
Medalists at the 2014 Asian Games
21st-century Kazakhstani women